Event Horizon is the debut studio album by British heavy metal band I Am I, released in 2012. The album was originally released on USB, then onto CD format, making I Am I the first heavy metal band ever to release an album only on USB first. The album has a few traces of the power metal sound of ZP's previous band DragonForce. The album has been described as "old school meets new school" by lead vocalist and co-writer ZP Theart. The album is quite melodic and a bit similar to the AOR of the 1970s and 1980s. The lyrics deal with human emotions, social life, and issues that people struggle with.

Track listing 
The USB limited edition version contained a set of bonus wallpapers, pictures of the band, music video for "Silent Genocide" and the trailer for the album. Later versions (2014 and onwards) also contained the singles "See You Again" and "You're the Voice", alongside the music video for "See You Again", without the trailer for the album.

All lyrics written by ZP Theart and all music composed by Jacob Ziemba, except where noted.

USB limited edition bonus tracks
Non-album singles were included in the USB in a separate "singles" folder.

Personnel 
 ZP Theart – vocals
 Jacob Ziemba – guitar
 Neil Salmon – bass
 Paul Clark Jr. – drums

Production 
 Produced By Lior Stein

References

2012 debut albums
I Am I (band) albums